Isuzu made an experimental 75-degree, four-stroke, naturally-aspirated, V-12 racing engine, dubbed the P799WE, designed for Formula one racing; between 1989 and 1991. The experimental unit was used in the Lotus 102B and Lotus 102C.

Background
The 102B enabled the team to equal their 1990 points total of three points. With increased sponsorship and the delay of the 107 it was to continue racing for the first four races of the 1992 season in D specification. The C specification incorporated an Isuzu P799WE (Japanese edition) V12 engine that had been developed throughout the season but never raced. The new engine produced impressive power, with rumours of around 750bhp reported. In the engine's one and only track test, the car was six seconds off the pace however. Ultimately, Peter Collins, team principal of Team Lotus, decided against a deal to use the unproven engine and Isuzu decided against entering Formula One anyway.

Specifications
Overall length: 690mm
Overall width: 580mm
Overall height: 495mm
Number of cylinders: V-type 12 cylinders
Cylinder bank angle (°): 75° 
Displacement: 3,493cc
Maximum horsepower: 646 hp @ 12,000rpm (early), 765 hp @ 13,500rpm (late)
Maximum torque: 41.0 kg·m (296.5 lb-ft) @ 10,000 rpm (initial), 42.5 kg·m (308 lb-ft) @ 11,500 rpm (late)
Piston: bore 85mm
Stroke: 51.3mm
Compression ratio: 13.0: 1
Weight: 158 kg (348 lbs.)

Applications
Lotus 102B
Lotus 102C

References

Isuzu
Engines by model
Gasoline engines by model
V12 engines
Formula One engines